Sansan is a commune in the Gers department in southwestern France.

The vicinity of Sansan is known for its Miocene fossil deposits where geologist Edouard Lartet unearthed the jaw of the primate Pliopithecus antiquus in 1837.

Geography

Localisation 
Sansan is located 14 km south of Auch and 4 km north of Seissan, along the Gers river.

Toponymy 
Sansan finds its origin in the Latin patronymic name Sancianus or Santius, followed by the suffix -anum, designing a property of which a man by this name must have been the owner in the times of Roman Gaul.

Population

See also
Communes of the Gers department

References

Communes of Gers
Paleontological sites of Europe